The Palestinian diaspora (al-shatat al-filastini), part of the wider Arab diaspora, are Palestinian people living outside the region of Palestine.

History
Palestinian individuals have a long history of migration. For instance, silk workers from Tiberias are mentioned in 13th-century Parisian tax records. However, the first large emigration wave of Arab Christians out of Palestine began in the mid-19th century; factors driving the emigration included economic opportunities, avoiding forced military service, and localized conflicts such as the 1860 civil conflict in Mount Lebanon and Damascus.

Since the 1948 Arab–Israeli War, Palestinians have experienced several waves of exile and have spread into different host countries around the world. In addition to the more than 700,000 Palestinian refugees of 1948, hundreds of thousands were also displaced in the 1967 Six-Day War. In fact, after 1967, a number of young Palestinian men were encouraged to migrate to South America. Together, these 1948 and 1967 refugees make up the majority of the Palestinian diaspora. Besides those displaced by war, others have emigrated overseas for various reasons such as work opportunity, education and religious persecution. In the decade following the 1967 war, for example, an average of 21,000 Palestinians per year were forced out of Israeli-controlled areas. The pattern of Palestinian flight continued during the 1970s, 1980s, and 1990s.

Population
In the absence of a comprehensive census including all Palestinian diaspora populations and those that remained within the area once known as the Mandatory Palestine, exact population figures are difficult to determine. According to the Palestinian Central Bureau of Statistics (PCBS), the number of Palestinians worldwide at the end of 2003 was 9.6 million, an increase of 800,000 since 2001.

The issue of the Palestinian right of return has been of central importance to Palestinians and more broadly the Arab world since 1948. It is the dream of many in the Palestinian diaspora, and is present most strongly in Palestinian refugee camps. In the largest such camp in Lebanon, Ain al-Hilweh, neighborhoods are named for the Galilee towns and villages from which the original refugees came, such as Az-Zeeb, Safsaf and Hittin. Even though 97% of the camp's inhabitants have never seen the towns and villages their parents and grandparents left behind, most insist that the right of return is an inalienable right and one that they will never renounce.

Population figures

It is estimated that more than 6 million Palestinians live in a global diaspora.

The countries outside the Palestinian territories with significant Palestinian populations are:

 Jordan 3,240,000
 Israel 1,650,000
 Syria 630,000
 Chile 500,000 (largest Palestinian community outside the Middle East).
 Lebanon 402,582
 Saudi Arabia 280,245
 Egypt 270,245
 United States 255,000 (the largest concentrations in Chicago, Detroit and Los Angeles; History of Palestinians in Los Angeles).
 Honduras 250,000
 Guatemala est. 200,000 
 Mexico 120,000
 Qatar 100,000
 Germany 80,000
 Kuwait 80,000
 El Salvador 70,000
 Brazil 59,000
 Iraq 57,000
 Yemen 55,000
 Canada 50,975
 Australia 45,000
 Libya 44,000
 Puerto Rico est. 30,000
 Greece est. 30,000
 United Kingdom 20,000
 Peru 19,000
 Denmark 15,000
 Colombia 12,000
 Japan est. 10,000
 Paraguay 10,000
 Netherlands 9,000
 Sweden 7,000
 Algeria 4,030
 Austria 4,010
 Norway 3,825
 The rest of Latin America, India, Russia, Sub-Saharan Africa and East Asia has fairly small Palestinian populations. 

The majority of the estimated 100,000 Palestinians in the European Union (EU) are in the United Kingdom, Denmark, France, Germany, Greece, Italy, the Netherlands, Spain and Sweden. Outside the EU is Norway and Switzerland. Germany's capital Berlin has one of the largest Palestinian communities outside of the Middle East with about 30,000-40,000 people of Palestinian origin residing in the city (~1% of the total population) .

In the United States, this includes a Palestinian community of 800-1,000 in Gallup, New Mexico highly involved in the area's Southwest jewelry industry.

Notable Palestinians in the diaspora
 Alex Atala, Brazilian chef
 Antoine Izméry, Haitian businessman and activist
 Belly, Canadian rapper
 Edílson, Brazilian footballer
 Gabriel Zaid, Mexican novelist and poet
 Jorge Yarur Banna, Chilean banker
 José Zalaquett, Chilean lawyer and human rights activist
 Lina Meruane, Chilean novelist
 Miguel Littín, Chilean film director
 Nagwa Fouad, Egyptian belly dancer
 Nasri, Canadian pop singer
 Nathalie Handal, Haitian poet and playwright
 Nayib Bukele, President of El Salvador, former mayor of San Salvador
 Raed Jarrar, American architect
 Rakad Salem, Iraqi politician
 Ricardo Abumohor, Chilean businessman, owner of Primera División club O'Higgins 
 Ruba Nadda, Canadian film director
 Sama Alshaibi, Iraqi designer and conceptual artist
 Salvador Nasralla, Vice President of Honduras, former sports journalist

See also
 1948 Palestinian exodus
 Jewish exodus from Arab and Muslim countries in the 20th century
 1949–56 Palestinian exodus
 1967 Palestinian exodus
 Palestinian exodus from Kuwait (Gulf War)
 Arab diaspora
 List of Palestinians

References

External links 
 Shaml - The Palestinian Diaspora and Refugee Centre
 The Palestinian Christian Diaspora in Jordan
 The French Le Monde Diplomatique ("The Diplomatic World") has two web sites with more accurate information on the Palestinian diaspora:
 The global Palestinian diaspora in the world (in French), Fébruary 2000;
 The Palestinian Refugee population in the Middle East (in French), Fébruary 2000.

 
History of the Palestinian refugees